Conceived in the Sky is the second studio album by British band, Vant. The album was released on 10 January 2020 through Dumb Blood Records.

Track listing

References

External links 
 

2020 albums
Vant (band) albums